The Booley Bay Formation is a geologic formation in Ireland. It preserves fossils dating back to the Cambrian period.

See also

 List of fossiliferous stratigraphic units in Ireland

References
 

Cambrian System of Europe
Cambrian Ireland
Cambrian south paleopolar deposits